The white-lined antbird (Myrmoborus lophotes) is a species of bird in the family Thamnophilidae. It is found in Bolivia, Brazil, and Peru. Its natural habitats are subtropical or tropical moist lowland forests and heavily degraded former forest.

This species was previously placed in the genus Percnostola but a genetic study published in 2013 found that it is embedded within Myrmoborus.

References

Myrmoborus
Birds of the Peruvian Amazon
Birds of the Bolivian Amazon
Birds described in 1914
Taxonomy articles created by Polbot